George Francis McNamara (January 11, 1901 – June 12, 1990) was a backup right fielder in Major League Baseball who played briefly for the Washington Senators during the  season. Listed at 6' 0", 175 lb., McNamara batted left-handed and threw right-handed. He was born in Chicago.

In a three-game career, McNamara was a .273 batting average hitter (3-for-11) with one RBI and a .333 on-base percentage. As an outfielder, he posted a 1.000 fielding percentage in three errorless chances.

McNamara died in Hinsdale, Illinois, at the age of  89.

See also
1922 Washington Senators season

External links
Baseball Reference
Retrosheet

Washington Senators (1901–1960) players
Major League Baseball right fielders
Baseball players from Illinois
1901 births
1990 deaths